Salman Ahmad (born 12 December 1963) is a Pakistani born-American musician, rock guitarist, physician, activist, occasional actor and professor at the City University of New York.

He earned nationwide popularity in 1998 for his unique style of neoclassical playing in rock. An early engineer of the Vital Signs, he formed Junoon (lit. Obsession) in 1990 with American bassist Brian O'Connell and pioneered the Sufi influenced rock music in Pakistan. He started his activism in the mid-1990s and has been involved in two BBC documentaries concerning the issues in Pakistan such as society, education, religion and science.

He has served as the UN Goodwill Ambassador for HIV/AIDS Programme towards spreading awareness about HIV in South Asia. While working with the Pakistan's media to help initiate peace between India and Pakistan, Ahmad continues to produce documentaries and solo guitar albums. At present, he is serving tenured professor at the Queens College of the City University of New York. With Junoon band being disintegrated, Salman Ahmad continues to perform as a solo artist under the "Junoon" label and has moved to New York and released one album as a solo artist, "Infiniti" in 2005.

Salman was tested positive for COVID-19 in April 2020.

Early life
Salman Ahmad spent his childhood in Pakistan and was educated at Aitchison College, before moving to New York when his father got a job in the airline industry. Ahmad then attended middle and high school in the United States, where he was first exposed to rock music at a Led Zeppelin concert at Madison Square Garden. Motivated to become a musician, he began learning the guitar against his parents wishes. After graduation, he returned to Pakistan in order to attend medical school. However, due to vast changes in the political climate and the advent of extremism, Ahmad's guitar playing was repressed. He took action by playing at covert talent shows, unfazed by criticism and even death threats from extremists. These underground performances and the consequent censorship set the stage for him to become a peace advocate and eventually found the bands Junoon and Vital Signs.

Music career
He has been teaching a class on music titled "Islamic Music and Culture of South Asia", as a guest faculty at Queens College. This year, he started his second semester as a guest faculty.
On 1 March 2008, Ahmad performed with Yale Strom (a world leading Klezmer artist) at Temple Beth Sholom in Roslyn Heights as part of another "Common Chords II" concert celebrating Muslim and Jewish Music. Together with Strom, Ahmad leads the multi-faith ensemble Common Chords, whose members include Chatterjee, dhol player Sunny Jain, bassist Mark Dresser, vocalist Elizabeth Schwartz and others. In 2016, his new song "Kaise Bolun" from an upcoming Bollywood movie "Rhythm" starring Adeel Chaudhry has received enormous negative feedback from his fans on social media through showing their discomfort over song's music and video. According to people, they never expected such kind of music from legendary Salman Ahmad.

Nobel Peace Prize concert in Norway 
Televised in around 100 countries, Ahmad and his band Junoon performed with artists from all over the world at the Nobel Peace Prize Concert in Oslo, Norway, on 11 December 2007. He also played at the Nobel Peace Prize Ceremony on 9 December 2007, where he was joined by tabla virtuoso Pandit Samir Chatterjee.

Censorship on Junoon
Ahmad and his band Junoon suffered political censorship in Pakistan during the administration of Benazir Bhutto in the 1990s, partly due to a song denouncing political corruption. In 1998 during the administration of Nawaz Sharif, Junoon was again banned in Pakistan, because they protested against the nuclear power tests in India as well as their own country by saying, "Why escalate the arms race when people still need water? Why see our neighbors as enemies when we are so close to each other?"

As a musician who faced censorship in his home country, Ahmad says that "there is no conflict between my faith and my music, you can be a Muslim and play electric guitar".

In 2006, during a Freemuse conference in Beirut he was part of one of the rare occasions where music and religion was taken seriously and where discussions on music and Islam focused on theology and not just social and cultural patterns. About this he said, "I've taken part in Freemuse dialogue meetings and press meetings. They have always been great meetings places for musicians, researchers and journalists and I've always felt that understanding the motivations behind and the mechanisms of censorship have been in focus – not just condemning censorship. Having said that, we, the artists, should always be ready to defend our colleagues when the rights to freedom of expression are attacked, and thus we need an organisation such as Freemuse to help us do this."

Acting career 
Ahmad has acted in television dramas.
 Dhundle Raste (Featured Vital Signs band)
 Aahat
 Talaash (Featured Junoon band)
  Gulls and Guys ( Documentary cum travel reality show)

The HBO documentary Open Your Eyes features the original song Open Your Eyes, composed by Salman Ahmad with vocals from Peter Gabriel.

 Writing 
Salman Ahmad published an autobiographical work titled Rock & Roll Jihad: A Muslim Rock Star's Revolution'' in January 2010, was published by Simon & Schuster.

Social work 
In 2009, Ahmad and his wife Samina were involved in raising money for Swat's Internally displaced persons.

As a UNAIDS Goodwill ambassador, he worked to raise awareness about HIV/AIDS. Ahmad while opening the first dialogue with young people at IX International Congress on AIDS in Asia and the Pacific's (ICAAP) Community Dialogue Space in 2009 said, "Young people need to be on board to turn the tide, as it is their decision-making over their bodies and their sexuality that will determine their future status".

Politics 
Salman Ahmad has been often seen at Pakistan Tehreek-e-Insaf's (tr. Pakistan Justice Party; simply known as PTI) rallies which is founded by cricketer-turned politician Imran Khan. Salman Ahmad sings patriotic and revolutionary songs in these rallies which revitalizes the whole environment, he is often alleged as being a member of the party as well. In October 2016, Salman Ahmad was taken into custody by Islamabad police along with various other PTI's workers after the activists clashed with the law enforcement officers in Rawalpindi.

See also 
 List of Pakistani musicians
 Music of Pakistan

References

External links 
 Junoon's Official Website and Salman's Tour Roster
 When the rock star met the mullah
 Salman's Profile on the Clinton Global Initiative
 Nobel Peace prize ceremony Salman Ahmad performance 
Washington Post interview with Salman Ahmad

Living people
Punjabi people
Musicians from Lahore
Aitchison College alumni
King Edward Medical University alumni
HIV/AIDS activists
Junoon (band) members
Pakistani guitarists
Pakistani rock guitarists
Pakistani pop singers
Pakistani heavy metal guitarists
Lead guitarists
Pakistani emigrants to the United States
1963 births
American musicians of Pakistani descent
People with acquired American citizenship
Male guitarists
American_Muslims